South Fly District is a district of the Western Province of Papua New Guinea.  Its capital is Daru. The area of the district is 31,864 km², with a population of 46,407 at the 2000 census.

The district is administratively subdivided into four Local Level Government Areas:
Daru Urban
Kiwai Rural
Morehead Rural
Oriomo-Bituri Rural

References

Districts of Papua New Guinea
Western Province (Papua New Guinea)